Ten Mile River Baptist Church, also known as Tusten Baptist Church, is a historic Baptist church on NY 97, at the junction with Cochecton Turnpike in Tusten, Sullivan County, New York. It was built in 1856 and is a small frame meeting house with modest Greek Revival style detailing. It features a small, reconstructed, bell tower and spire. The church cemetery includes the gravesite of Gustavus A. Neumann, founding editor of the New Yorker Staats-Zeitung.

It was added to the National Register of Historic Places in 1997.

References

Baptist churches in New York (state)
Churches on the National Register of Historic Places in New York (state)
Churches completed in 1856
19th-century Baptist churches in the United States
Churches in Sullivan County, New York
National Register of Historic Places in Sullivan County, New York